Vaucluse is an unincorporated community in Frederick County, Virginia. Vaucluse is located on U.S. Route 11 south of Stephens City.

References

Unincorporated communities in Frederick County, Virginia
Unincorporated communities in Virginia

vo:Vaucluse